Events from the year 1768 in Denmark.

Incumbents
 Monarch – Christian VII
 Prime minister –  Count Johann Hartwig Ernst von Bernstorff

Events
 16 August – The equestrian statue of Frederick V is installed on Amalienborg in Copenhagen.
 8 November – Wedding of Christian VII and Caroline Mathilde.

Undated

Births
 
 January 28 – Frederick VI, King of Denmark (died 1839)
 Mariane Bournonville, ballerina (died 1797)

Full date missing
 Mariane Bournonville, ballet dancer (died 1797)

Deaths
 9 February – Anne Cathrine Collett, landowner (died 1846)
 21 March – Christian Fleischer, civil servant (born 1713)

Full date missing
 Christian Tychsen, governor

References

 
1760s in Denmark
Denmark
Years of the 18th century in Denmark